Lleyton Hewitt defeated Sébastien Grosjean in the final, 6–3, 6–3, 6–4 to win the singles tennis title at the 2001 Tennis Masters Cup. With the win, he secured the year-end world No. 1 ranking for the first time.

Gustavo Kuerten was the defending champion, but was eliminated in the round-robin stage.

Seeds
A champion seed is indicated in bold text while text in italics indicates the round in which that seed was eliminated.

Alternate

Draw

Finals

Rosewall group
Standings are determined by: 1. number of wins; 2. number of matches; 3. in two-players-ties, head-to-head records; 4. in three-players-ties, percentage of sets won, or of games won; 5. steering-committee decision.

Newcombe group
Standings are determined by: 1. number of wins; 2. number of matches; 3. in two-players-ties, head-to-head records; 4. in three-players-ties, percentage of sets won, or of games won; 5. steering-committee decision.

See also
ATP World Tour Finals appearances

External links
 2001 Tennis Masters Cup Draw

Singles